Run Before the Wind is the second novel in the Will Lee series by Stuart Woods, written as a semi-sequel to his first novel Chiefs. It was first published in 1983 by W. W. Norton & Company The novel takes place in Ireland, a decade after the events of Chiefs. The story continues the story of the Lee family of Delano, Georgia. It is also the only published novel by Stuart Woods to feature a first person point of view.

Plot summary
Will Lee ran from a life of Southern wealth and privilege to spend a peaceful summer on the coast of Ireland. But there is no peace in this beautiful, troubled land. Restless and dissatisfied, Will dreams of shipbuilding and sailing on crystal-blue waters. But an explosion of senseless violence is dragging the young American drifter into a lethal game of terror and revenge. For the fires of hatred rage unchecked in this place of lush, rolling hills and deadly secrets. Now Will Lee must run for his life from a bloody past that is not his own-and he will find no sanctuary on the rolling waves of the Irish sea. A breathtaking novel of suspense and high-adventure by New York Times bestselling author Stuart Woods.

References

External links
Stuart Woods official site

1983 novels
American thriller novels
Sequel novels
Novels set in Ireland
W. W. Norton & Company books